The European Pair Go Championship (EPGC) is a European international tournament for amateur Go players under the Pair Go rule, held once a year since 1997.

History
The first European Pair Go Championship was held in 1997.

Past champions

See also
 International Amateur Pair Go Championship
 European Go Championship
 Go competitions
 Go players
 European Go Players
 Rengo

References

External links
European Pair Go Camhpionship 2013
The European Go Federation

Go competitions in Europe